The Cree Nation of Chisasibi is a Cree First Nation in Quebec, Canada. It is headquartered at the Cree village of Chisasibi in the Eeyou Istchee territory in Northern Quebec. The nation also has a terre réservée crie or Cree reserved land of the same name covering  around the village. , the Nation is in negotiation with the government of Canada to obtain its self-governance. , it has a registered population of 4,585 members.

References

First Nations governments in Quebec
Cree governments